The Gaunt Stranger (released  as The Phantom Strikes in the US) is a 1938 British mystery thriller film directed by Walter Forde. It stars Sonnie Hale, Wilfrid Lawson and Alexander Knox.

Plot
A notorious killer, long believed to have died in Australia, returns to England seeking revenge for the death of his sister. The "Ringer" threatens to murder the criminal mastermind Maurice Meister. Detective Inspector Alan Wembury is assigned to the case and, despite his strong dislike for Meister, attempts to protect him with the reluctant assistance of another criminal, Sam Hackett, who has been released from prison as he is the only man able to identify the "Ringer". Even with his help, Wembury struggles to unmask their target before the time at which Meister is due to be killed.

Cast

Sonnie Hale as Samuel Cuthbert "Sam" Hackett
Wilfrid Lawson as Maurice Meister
Louise Henry as Cora Ann Milton
Alexander Knox as Dr Lomond
Peter Croft as John Lenley
George Merritt as Police Station Sergeant
Patrick Barr as Det. Insp. Alan Wembury
John Longden as Inspector Bliss
Patricia Roc as Mary Lenley
Arthur Hambling as Detective Sergeant Richards
Charles Eaton as Colonel Walford

Production and release
The film was made by and at Ealing Studios, and was the company's first release after Michael Balcon's appointment as head of production. It was based on the 1925 novel The Gaunt Stranger by Edgar Wallace, which had been renamed The Ringer in 1926, and which Forde had previously adapted as The Ringer in 1931. So the 1939 film used the original novel title, although the opening credits state that it is based on Wallace's novel The Ringer. The film was screened by the censors on 4 October 1938, but didn't premier until 10 January 1939, when it opened at Gaumont Haymarket as second film in a double bill with The Cowboy and the Lady. It was, however, popular enough for a British re-release in 1945.

See also
 The Ringer (1928)
 The Ringer (1931)
 The Ringer (1932)
 The Ringer (1952)
 Der Hexer (1964)

References

IMDB give John Longden as Inspector Wembury, in fact Patrick Barr played this part.

Bibliography
 Low, Rachael. Filmmaking in 1930s Britain. George Allen & Unwin, 1985.
 Perry, George. Forever Ealing. Pavilion Books, 1994.
 Wood, Linda. British Films, 1927–1939. British Film Institute, 1986.

External links
 
 

1938 films
1930s crime thriller films
1930s mystery thriller films
British crime thriller films
British mystery thriller films
British black-and-white films
Films based on works by Edgar Wallace
British films based on plays
Ealing Studios films
Films directed by Walter Forde
Films produced by Michael Balcon
Films set in London
1930s English-language films
1930s British films